Face the Truth is the second solo album by John Norum-- guitarist for the Swedish hard rock-band Europe. It was released in 1992.

Several songs on the album are sung by former Black Sabbath / Deep Purple vocalist Glenn Hughes. The song Opium Trail is Thin Lizzy cover. We Will Be Strong--a duet with Europe vocalist Joey Tempest-- is not included on the American edition of the album. The Swedish special edition contains a biography of John Norum written in Swedish.

Track listing

European, Japanese Pressings
 "Face the Truth" – 4:17 (Glenn Hughes, John Norum)
 "Night Buzz" – 3:22 (Norum, Henrik Hildén, Michelle Meldrum)
 "In Your Eyes" – 3:45 (Hughes, Norum, Peter Baltes)
 "Opium Trail" – 4:00 (Brian Downey, Phil Lynott, Scott Gorham)
 "We Will Be Strong" – 4:12 (Norum, Joey Tempest, Billy Haggerty)
 "Good Man Shining" – 3:04 (Hughes, Norum, Mats Attaque, Micke Höglund, Thomas Broman)
 "Time Will Find the Answer" – 5:02 (Hughes, Norum, Billy White)
 "Counting on Your Love" – 3:16 (Göran Edman, Hughes, Tempest, Norum, Peter Hermansson)
 "Endica" – 2:44 (Norum, Baltes)
 "Still the Night" – 3:58 (Hughes, Pat Thrall, Paul Delph)
 "Distant Voices" – 5:46 (Norum, Hughes, Baltes, White)

Personnel
John Norum – Guitars, backing vocals, lead vocals on tracks 2, 4 & co-lead vocals on 5
Glenn Hughes – Lead vocals
Peter Baltes – Bass
Henrik Hildén – Drums 
Joey Tempest - Co-lead Vocals on "We Will Be Strong"
Billy White - Rhythm guitar on "Time Will Find the Answer"
Mikkey Dee - Drums on "Distant Voices"
John Schreiner - Keyboards
Andy Lorber - Additional backing vocals

Album credits 
Produced by: John Norum and Wyn Davis
Engineered by: Wyn Davis and Melissa Sewell
Mixed by: Max Norman and Wyn Davis
Mastered by: Bob Ludwig at Masterdisk
 Assistant Engineer: Doug Drury
Recorded at: Total Access Recording, Redondo Beach, CA
Mixed at: One on One, The Grey Room and The Enterprice , Studio City, CA
Logo Design by Johan Jäger / Drömfabriken
Cover Design by: John Norum and Johan Jäger

John Norum albums
1992 albums
CBS Records albums